Toxic Holocaust is an American thrash metal band from Portland, Oregon.

History

Joel Grind founded Toxic Holocaust in 1999. He originally wrote and recorded all of the band's music himself, and after a couple of demo releases (Radiation Sickness, 1999; Critical Mass, 2002), he made his official album debut as Toxic Holocaust with Evil Never Dies (2003). 

Two years later, after some touring with a hired backing band, Grind released the second Toxic Holocaust album, Hell on Earth (2005), which once again he wrote and recorded by himself. The album notably features cover art by Ed Repka, known for having created iconic covers for albums by Megadeth, Death and others. Extensive touring followed, along with a recording contract with Relapse Records. 

In addition to releasing the third Toxic Holocaust album, An Overdose of Death... (2008), Relapse reissued Evil Never Dies and Hell on Earth. Toxic Holocaust also recorded and released a number of other recordings: Gravelord (2009, EP), Conjure and Command (2011), and Chemistry of Consciousness (2013). 

In 2019 Joel Grind signed to Entertainment One, and released Primal Future: 2019 later that year. Tours were planned but halted due to the spread of COVID-19.

Joel Grind 

Joel Grind is the frontman and main songwriter of Toxic Holocaust. He now lives in Oregon. Grind began his musical career at a young age, first playing drums. His musical influences included bands such as Metallica, Bathory, Venom, and Sodom. As a teen, he ran a home recording and mixing business for local bands. In 1999, he started Toxic Holocaust. Around this time, he picked up guitar. 

Grind now works as a music producer, and has been involved in side projects other than Toxic Holocaust. He has released synth tracks, as well as metal albums for his solo projects War Ripper and the Yellowgoat Sessions. Grind is known for being social with his fans and can often be seen at the merchandise table before a Toxic Holocaust show.

Members
Current members
 Joel Grind – lead vocals (1999–present), bass (1999–2008, 2015–present), guitars (1999–2015), drums (1999–2008)
 Tyler Becker – drums (2018–present)
 Robert Gray – guitars, backing vocals (2019–present)

Touring musicians
 Charlie Bellmore – guitars, backing vocals (2015–2018)

Past members
 Al Positions – drums (2008–2009)
 Phil Zeller – bass, backing vocals (2008–2015)
 Nick Bellmore – drums (2009–2018)
 Eric Eisenhauer – guitars, backing vocals (2018–2019)

 Timeline

Discography

Studio albums 
Evil Never Dies (2003)
Hell on Earth (2005)
An Overdose of Death... (2008)
Conjure and Command (2011)
Chemistry of Consciousness (2013)
Primal Future: 2019 (2019)

EPs 
Death Master (2003, EP Gloom Records)
Power from Hell (2004, EP)
Reaper's Grave (2006, EP Gloom Records)
Gravelord (2009, EP)

Demos 

 Radiation Sickness (1999, demo)
 Critical Mass (2002, demo)
 Promo 2004 (2004, demo)
 Demo 2007 (2008, demo)

Live and video albums 
Only Deaf is Real (2007, live album)
Brazilian Slaughter 2006 (2008, video album)

Compilations 
Toxic Thrash Metal (2004, CD)
From the Ashes of Nuclear Destruction (2013, CD)

Splits 
Toxic Holocaust / Oprichniki (2001, split CD)
Implements of Mass Destruction / Nuclear Apocalypse:666 (2002, split CD)
Outbreak of Evil (2004, split CD)
Thrashbeast from Hell (2004, split tape)
Blasphemy, Mayhem, War (2005, split CD)
Don't Burn the Witch... (2006, split 10-inch)
Speed n' Spikes Volume 1 (2008, split 7-inch)
Toxic Holocaust / Inepsy (2010, split 12-inch)
Toxic Holocaust / Midnight (2011 split 7-inch to benefit the Japanese tsunami victims)
Toxic Waste (with Municipal Waste) (2012, split 12-inch)

Contributions 
Thrashing Like a Maniac (2007, CD)
In the Sign of Sodom - Sodomaniac Tribute (2008, 12-inch)
Power Trip - Nightmare Logic (2017, CD) [mastering]

Videography 
"Wild Dogs"
"Nuke the Cross"
"Lord of the Wasteland"
"Judgement Awaits"
"666"
"Agony of the Damned"
"Acid Fuzz"

References

External links

1999 establishments in Oregon
American musical trios
American thrash metal musical groups
Heavy metal musical groups from Oregon
Musical groups established in 1999
Musical groups from Portland, Oregon
Musical trios
Relapse Records artists